José Amador de los Ríos y Serrano (30 April 1818 – 17 February 1878) was a Spanish intellectual, primarily a historian and archaeologist of art and literature. He was a graduate in history of the Complutense University of Madrid.

In 1844 he was the secretary of the Comisión Central de Monumentos. He was co-director with Antonio de Zabaleta of the ephemeral Boletín Español de Arquitectura, the first Spanish journal dedicated exclusively to architecture. It was only in publication from 1 June to December 1846. In 1852 he published the complete works of Íñigo López de Mendoza. It was Amador de los Ríos who first used the term mudejarismo to describe a form of  architectural decoration in 1859.

In 1861 he published the first volume of Historia crítica de la literatura española, the first general history of Spanish literature written in Spain. It was to remain incomplete. Ideologically Amador de los Ríos, a liberal and romantic, conceives of Spain as a unit, at once Roman Catholic and Castilian, a constitutional monarchy (though it was not one yet) united with its past by an idea luminosa (luminous idea). Countering the foreign historians who regard medieval Spain as a backwater, he also defended Spanish literature as the foremost among those which appeared after the Fall of Rome. Though he only covered the Middle Ages, he demonstrated that he regarded Spanish American literature as part of the Spanish tradition. In another work, Historia social, política y religiosa de los judíos de España, he accepts the Spanish Jewish literature as part of the tradition, since it "bloomed" in Spanish soil. Unlike Adolf de Castro, however, he did not condemn the Spanish Inquisition.

Notes

1818 births
1878 deaths
Spanish art historians
Complutense University of Madrid alumni
19th-century Spanish historians